A messiah complex (Christ complex or savior complex) is a state of mind in which an individual holds a belief that they are destined to become a savior today or in the near future. The term can also refer to a state of mind in which an individual believes that they are responsible for saving or assisting others.

Religious delusion 
The term "messiah complex" is not addressed in the Diagnostic and Statistical Manual of Mental Disorders (DSM), as it is not a clinical term nor diagnosable disorder. However, the symptoms as a proposed disorder closely resemble those found in individuals with delusions of grandeur or that they have grandiose self-images that veer towards the delusional. An account specifically identified it as a category of religious delusion, which pertains to strong fixed beliefs that cause distress or disability. It is the type of religious delusion that is classified as grandiose while the other two categories are: persecutory and belittlement. According to philosopher Antony Flew, an example of this type of delusion was the case of Paul, who declared that God spoke to him, telling him that he would serve as a conduit for people to change. The Kent–Flew thesis argued that his experience entailed auditory and visual hallucinations.

Examples 
In terms of the attitude wherein an individual sees themselves as having to save another or a group of poor people, there is the notion that the action inflates their own sense of importance and discounts the skills and abilities of the people they are helping to improve their own lives.

The messiah complex is most often reported in patients with bipolar disorder and schizophrenia. When a messiah complex is manifested within a religious individual after a visit to Jerusalem, it may be identified as a psychosis known as Jerusalem syndrome.

See also 
 Cassandra complex
 Chosen people
 God complex
 List of avatar claimants
 List of Buddha claimants
 List of Mahdi claimants
 List of messiah claimants
 List of people claimed to be Jesus
 Mental health of Jesus
 Messianism
 White savior

References

Complex (psychology)
Popular psychology
Narcissism
Delusions
Messianism